Radio Fresh FM is a radio station in Idlib province in northern Syria. Its manager was Raed Fares. In 2017, the radio station was reported to be playing sound effects recordings instead of music in response to demands that it stop playing music which were made by Jabhat Fateh al-Sham, the Islamist militant group controlling the area.

References 

Radio stations in Syria
Arabic-language radio stations